Preppers is a 2021 Australian television comedy series that aired on ABC Television.

Plot
Preppers follows Charlie, a young Aboriginal woman who encounters a community of preppers at a place they call "Eden 2".

Cast

Production

The six-part series is created and written by Nakkiah Lui and Gabriel Dowrick and directed by Steven McGregor.

Episodes

Series 1 (2021)

Awards
Preppers was nominated for Best Narrative Comedy Series and Best Comedy Performer (Nakkiah Lui) at the 2021 AACTA Awards.

References

External links

Australian Broadcasting Corporation original programming
Australian comedy television series
2021 Australian television series debuts
English-language television shows
Television shows set in Sydney